Prasino (Greek: Πράσινο meaning "green") may refer to several places in Greece:

Prasino, Arcadia, a town in Arcadia
Prasino, Boeotia, a village in Boeotia
Prasino, Elis, a village in Elis